Winterton Rangers F.C. are a football club based in Winterton, North Lincolnshire, England.

History
The club was established in 1934. They were originally an intermediate side before becoming members of the Scunthorpe & District League in 1935.

Winterton have used just two grounds in their history. They were situated at Watery Lane until 1950 when a piece of land was purchased at West Street. In 1965 they joined the Lincolnshire County League until 1970 when they accepted an invitation to the Yorkshire Football League. Over the next decade they won the Yorkshire Football League on three occasions.

They reached the 4th qualifying round of the FA Cup in 1971–72 and 1976–77 and the Quarter-Final stage of the FA Vase in 1976–77. In 1978 they won the Philips six-a-side floodlight cup, beating Newcastle Blue Star in the Final. Their prize was six floodlights.

In 1982–83 they became founder members of the Northern Counties East League (NCEL), when the Yorkshire League and Midland League amalgamated. Just 2 seasons later the club disbanded due to financial difficulties. In 1986 Rangers then re-entered the NCEL Division 2 winning he title in 1989–90 and were promoted directly to the Premier Division. After 4 seasons they were relegated to the NCEL Division 1.

Since November 2004 they have been managed by former Hull City and Wolverhampton Wanderers player Peter Daniel. Rangers have an agreement with Hull City for the use of the pitch by the Football League club's reserve team and junior sides.

Three junior sides play under the Rangers banner.

Honours

League
 Northern Counties East League Premier Division
 Winners (1): 2007–08
 Northern Counties East League Division One
 Runners-up (1): 2006–07
 Northern Counties East League Division Two
 Winners (1): 1989–90 Yorkshire Football League Division One Winners (3): 1971–72, 1976–77, 1978–79
 Runners-Up (1): 1977–78

Cup
 Lincolnshire Senior B Cup Winners (1):''' 1969–70

Records 
 Best in FA Cup : 4th Qualifying Rd. 1971/72, 1976/77
 Best in FA Vase : Quarter Final 1976/77

External links
Club website

Football clubs in England
Northern Counties East Football League
Football clubs in Lincolnshire
Association football clubs established in 1934
1934 establishments in England
Yorkshire Football League
Winterton, Lincolnshire